Portland is a city in and the county seat of Jay County, Indiana, United States. The population was 6,223 at the 2010 census, and in 2018 the estimated population was 6,085.

History
Portland was platted in 1837. It was named after Portland, Maine.

The Jay County Courthouse, Portland Commercial Historic District, and Jonas Votaw House are listed on the National Register of Historic Places.

Geography

The Salamonie River runs through the city just south of its center. The Salamonie is a west-flowing tributary of the Wabash River.

Demographics

2010 census
At the 2010 census there were 6,223 people, 2,607 households, and 1,620 families living in the city. The racial makup of the city was 94.5% White, 0.4% African American, 0.5% Asian, 3.1% from other races, and 1.5% from two or more races. Hispanic or Latino of any race were 5.8%.

Of the 2,607 households 30.4% had children under the age of 18 living with them, 42.7% were married couples living together, 14.0% single female householder, 5.4% single male householder, and 37.9% were non-families. 32.1% of households were one person and 14.2% were one person aged 65 or older. The average household size was 2.32 and the average family size was 2.89.

The median age was 39.4 years. 23.7% of residents were under the age of 18; 8.6% were between the ages of 18 and 24; 25.1% were from 25 to 44; 24.7% were from 45 to 64; and 17.9% were 65 or older. The gender makeup of the city was 46.8% male and 53.2% female.

Education
The town has a lending library, the Jay County Public Library.

Notable people
Leon Ames, actor, founder of Screen Actors Guild in 1933
Stephanie Arnold, competed in women's archery in the 2004 Olympics
Oscar Ray Bolin, serial killer
Pete Brewster, professional football player
Pete Daily, musician
Kevin A. Ford, astronaut, piloted NASA space shuttle mission to International Space Station in 2009
Elwood Haynes (born in Portland, 1857) invented the clutch-driven automobile in 1894
Jack Imel, television producer, Lawrence Welk Show
Richard T. James, Indiana lieutenant governor 1945-49
Kenneth MacDonald, actor, born Kenneth Dollins; he worked for many years at Columbia Pictures in short features and in the Three Stooges movies
Mary Meeker (born in Portland, 1960) investment banker, made Internet economically viable by promoting it to investors in the 1990s, (becoming known as the "Queen of the Internet")
John P. C. Shanks, U.S. Representative from Indiana, Union Army major general
Twyla Tharp, Emmy and Tony Award-winning choreographer
Bill Wallace (born 1945), martial artist
Greg Williams, WNBA coach, college basketball player at Rice University

References

External links

City of Portland official website
The Commercial Review

Cities in Indiana
Cities in Jay County, Indiana
County seats in Indiana